Kavir Rural District may refer to:
 Kavir Rural District (Isfahan Province)
 Kavir Rural District (Razavi Khorasan Province)
 Kavir Rural District (South Khorasan Province)